The Jat people are a social group of India and Pakistan.

Jat, Jats, JAT or JATS may also refer to:

Airlines
 Jat Airways, a former Serbian airline
 Japan Air Transport (JAT), a defunct airline of Japan
 JetSmart, a South American airline, ICAO code JAT

Computing
 Java Astrodynamics Toolkit (JAT)
 Java Agent Template (JATS)
 Journal Article Tag Suite (JATS), an XML format

Journals
 Journal of Analytical Toxicology (JAT)
Journal of the Adventist Theological Society (JATS)

Other uses
 Jat of Afghanistan, peripatetic groups of Afghanistan
 Jat, Sangli, a town in Maharashtra, India
 Jat (Vidhan Sabha constituency)
 Jat or Yat (Ѣ), a letter of the old Cyrillic alphabet
 Jat Regiment, Indian Army
 Japan Association of Translators (JAT)
 James Arnold Taylor, American voice actor
 Joint Air Training Scheme (JATS), part of the WW2 British Commonwealth Air Training Plan
Jaysh al-Thuwar, a militia in the Free Syrian Army/Syrian Democratic Forces

See also 
 Jati (disambiguation)
 Jatt (disambiguation)
 Jatki (disambiguation)